May 2016

See also

References

 05
May 2016 events in the United States